Climate change has adversely affected terrestrial and marine ecosystems, including tundras, mangroves, coral reefs, and caves. Increasing global temperature, more frequent occurrence of extreme weather, and rising sea level are examples of the most impactful effects of climate change. Possible consequences of these effects include species decline and extinction, change within ecosystems, increased prevalence of invasive species, forests converting from carbon sinks to carbon sources, ocean acidification, disruption of the water cycle, and increased occurrence of natural disasters.

General

Climate change is affecting terrestrial ecoregions. Increasing global temperature means that ecosystems are changing; some species are being forced out of their habitats (possibly to extinction) because of changing conditions. An example is migration. Due to the ever hotter weather, birds are forced to move to foreign lands. Other effects of global warming include less snow fall, rising sea levels, Ozone depleting and weather changes. These may influence human activities and the ecosystem.

Within the IPCC Fourth Assessment Report, experts assessed the literature on the impacts of climate change on ecosystems. Rosenzweig et al. (2007) concluded that over the last three decades, human-induced warming had likely had a discernible influence on many physical and biological systems (p. 81). Schneider et al. (2007) concluded, with very high confidence, that regional temperature trends had already affected species and ecosystems around the world (p. 792). They also concluded that climate change would result in the extinction of many species and a reduction in the diversity of different types of ecosystems (p. 792).
 Terrestrial ecosystems and biodiversity: With a warming of 4-5 °C, relative to 2010 levels, it is likely that global terrestrial vegetation would become a net source of carbon (Schneider et al., 2007:792). With high confidence, Schneider et al. (2007:788) concluded that a global mean temperature increase of around 4 °C (above the 2010–2015) by 2100 would lead to major extinctions around the world.
 Marine ecosystems and biodiversity: With high confidence, scientists concluded that a warming of 2-3 °C above 2010 levels would result in mass mortality of coral reefs globally. In addition, several studies dealing with planktonic organisms and modelling have shown that temperature plays a transcendental role in marine microbial food webs, which may have a deep influence on the biological carbon pump of marine planktonic pelagic and mesopelagic ecosystems.
 Freshwater ecosystems: Above about a 4 °C increase in global mean temperature by 2100 (relative to 2010), scientists concluded, with high confidence, that many freshwater species would become extinct or largely endangered.

Biodiversity

Extinction 

Studying the association between Earth climate and extinctions over the past 520 million years, scientists from the University of York write, "The global temperatures predicted for the coming centuries may trigger a new 'mass extinction event', where over 50 percent of animal and plant species would be wiped out."

Many of the species at risk are Arctic and Antarctic fauna such as polar bears and emperor penguins. In the Arctic, the waters of Hudson Bay are ice-free for three weeks longer than they were thirty years ago, affecting polar bears, which prefer to hunt on sea ice. Species that rely on cold weather conditions such as gyrfalcons, and snowy owls that prey on lemmings that use the cold winter to their advantage may be negatively affected. Marine invertebrates achieve peak growth at the temperatures they have adapted to, and cold-blooded animals found at high latitudes and altitudes generally grow faster to compensate for the short growing season. Warmer-than-ideal conditions result in higher metabolism and consequent reductions in body size despite increased foraging, which in turn elevates the risk of predation. Indeed, even a slight increase in temperature during development impairs growth efficiency and survival rate in rainbow trout.

Mechanistic studies have documented extinctions due to recent climate change: McLaughlin et al. documented two populations of Bay checkerspot butterfly being threatened by precipitation change.
Parmesan states, "Few studies have been conducted at a scale that encompasses an entire species" and McLaughlin et al. agreed "few mechanistic studies have linked extinctions to recent climate change." Daniel Botkin and other authors in one study believe that projected rates of extinction are overestimated.  For "recent" extinctions, see Holocene extinction.

Many species of freshwater and saltwater plants and animals are dependent on glacier-fed waters to ensure a cold water habitat that they have adapted to. Some species of freshwater fish need cold water to survive and to reproduce, and this is especially true with salmon and cutthroat trout. Reduced glacier runoff can lead to insufficient stream flow to allow these species to thrive. Ocean krill, a cornerstone species, prefer cold water and are the primary food source for aquatic mammals such as the blue whale. Alterations to the ocean currents, due to increased freshwater inputs from glacier melt, and the potential alterations to thermohaline circulation of the worlds oceans, may affect existing fisheries upon which humans depend as well.

The white lemuroid possum, only found in the Daintree mountain forests of northern Queensland, may be the first mammal species to be driven extinct by global warming in Australia. In 2008, the white possum has not been seen in over three years.

A 27-year study of the largest colony of Magellanic penguins in the world, published in 2014, found that extreme weather caused by climate change is responsible for killing 7% of penguin chicks per year on average, and in some years studied climate change accounted for up to 50% of all chick deaths. Since 1987, the number of breeding pairs in the colony has reduced by 24%.

Furthermore, climate change may disrupt ecological partnerships among interacting species, via changes on behaviour and phenology, or via climate niche mismatch. The disruption of species-species associations is a potential consequence of climate-driven movements of each individual species towards opposite directions. Climate change may, thus, lead to another extinction, more silent and mostly overlooked: the extinction of species' interactions. As a consequence of the spatial decoupling of species-species associations, ecosystem services derived from biotic interactions are also at risk from climate niche mismatch.

Behaviour change 
Rising temperatures are beginning to have a noticeable impact on birds, and butterflies nearly 160 species from 10 different zones have shifted their ranges northward by 200 km in Europe and North America. The migration range of larger animals may be constrained by human development. In Britain, spring butterflies are appearing an average of 6 days earlier than two decades ago.

A 2002 article in Nature surveyed the scientific literature to find recent changes in range or seasonal behaviour by plant and animal species. Of species showing recent change, 4 out of 5 shifted their ranges towards the poles or higher altitudes, creating "refugee species". Frogs were breeding, flowers blossoming and birds migrating an average 2.3 days earlier each decade; butterflies, birds and plants moving towards the poles by 6.1 km per decade. A 2005 study concludes human activity is the cause of the temperature rise and resultant changing species behaviour, and links these effects with the predictions of climate models to provide validation for them. Scientists have observed that Antarctic hair grass is colonizing areas of Antarctica where previously their survival range was limited.

Climate change is leading to a mismatch between the snow camouflage of arctic animals such as snowshoe hares with the increasingly snow-free landscape.

Invasive species

Forests and climate change

As the northern forests are a carbon sink, while dead forests are a major carbon source, the loss of such large areas of forest has a positive feedback on global warming. In the worst years, the carbon emission due to beetle infestation of forests in British Columbia alone approaches that of an average year of forest fires in all of Canada or five years worth of emissions from that country's transportation sources.

Research suggests that slow-growing trees only are stimulated in growth for a short period under higher CO2 levels, while faster growing plants like liana benefit in the long term. In general, but especially in rainforests, this means that liana become the prevalent species; and because they decompose much faster than trees their carbon content is more quickly returned to the atmosphere. Slow growing trees incorporate atmospheric carbon for decades.

Wildfires 

Healthy and unhealthy forests appear to face an increased risk of forest fires because of the warming climate. The 10-year average of boreal forest burned in North America, after several decades of around 10,000 km2 (2.5 million acres), has increased steadily since 1970 to more than 28,000 km2 (7 million acres) annually. Though this change may be due in part to changes in forest management practices, in the western U.S., since 1986, longer, warmer summers have resulted in a fourfold increase of major wildfires and a sixfold increase in the area of forest burned, compared to the period from 1970 to 1986. A similar increase in wildfire activity has been reported in Canada from 1920 to 1999.

Forest fires in Indonesia have dramatically increased since 1997 as well. These fires are often actively started to clear forest for agriculture. They can set fire to the large peat bogs in the region and the CO₂released by these peat bog fires has been estimated, in an average year, to be 15% of the quantity of CO₂ produced by fossil fuel combustion.

A 2018 study found that trees grow faster due to increased carbon dioxide levels, however, the trees are also eight to twelve percent lighter and denser since 1900. The authors note, "Even though a greater volume of wood is being produced today, it now contains less material than just a few decades ago."The Arctic region, is particularly sensitive and warming faster than most other regions. Particles of smoke can land on snow and ice, causing them to absorb sunlight that it would otherwise reflect, accelerating the warming. Fires in the Arctic also increase the risk of permafrost thawing that releases methane -  strong greenhouse gas. Improving forecasting systems is important to solve the problem. In view of the risks, WMO has created a Vegetation Fire and Smoke Pollution Warning and Advisory System for forecasting fires and related impacts and hazards across the globe. WMO's Global Atmosphere Watch Programme has released a short video about the issue.

Invasive species in forests 

An invasive species is any kind of living organism that is not native to an ecosystem that adversely affects it. These negative effects can include the extinction of native plants or animals, biodiversity destruction, and permanent habitat alteration.

Pine forests in British Columbia have been devastated by a pine beetle infestation, which has expanded unhindered since 1998 at least in part due to the lack of severe winters since that time; a few days of extreme cold kill most mountain pine beetles and have kept outbreaks in the past naturally contained. The infestation, which (by November 2008) has killed about half of the province's lodgepole pines (33 million acres or 135,000 km2) is an order of magnitude larger than any previously recorded outbreak. One reason for unprecedented host tree mortality may be due to that the mountain pine beetles have higher reproductive success in lodgepole pine trees growing in areas where the trees have not experienced frequent beetle epidemics, which includes much of the current outbreak area. In 2007 the outbreak spread, via unusually strong winds, over the continental divide to Alberta. An epidemic also started, be it at a lower rate, in 1999 in Colorado, Wyoming, and Montana. The United States forest service predicts that between 2011 and 2013 virtually all  of Colorado's lodgepole pine trees over five inches (127 mm) in diameter will be lost.

Taiga 
Climate change is having a disproportionate impact on boreal forests, which are warming at a faster rate than the global average. leading to drier conditions in the Taiga, which leads to a whole host of subsequent issues.  Climate change has a direct impact on the productivity of the boreal forest, as well as health and regeneration.  As a result of the rapidly changing climate, trees are migrating to higher latitudes and altitudes (northward), but some species may not be migrating fast enough to follow their climatic habitat.  Moreover, trees within the southern limit of their range may begin to show declines in growth.  Drier conditions are also leading to a shift from conifers to aspen in more fire and drought-prone areas.

Assisted migration 
Assisted migration, the act of moving plants or animals to a different habitat, has been proposed as a solution to the above problem. For species that may not be able to disperse easily, have long generation times or have small populations, this form of adaptive management and human intervention may help them survive in this rapidly changing climate.

The assisted migration of North American forests has been discussed and debated by the science community for decades. In the late 2000s and early 2010s, the Canadian provinces of Alberta and British Columbia finally acted and modified their tree reseeding guidelines to account for the northward movement of forest's optimal ranges. British Columbia even gave the green light for the relocation of a single species, the western larch, 1000 km northward.

Mountain pine beetle and forest fires 

Climate change and the associated changing weather patterns occurring worldwide have a direct effect on biology, population ecology, and the population of eruptive insects, such as the mountain pine beetle (MPB). This is because temperature is a factor which determines insect development and population success. Mountain Pine Beetle are a species native to Western North America. Prior to climatic and temperature changes, the mountain pine beetle predominately lived and attacked lodgepole and ponderosa pine trees at lower elevations, as the higher elevation Rocky Mountains and Cascades were too cold for their survival. Under normal seasonal freezing weather conditions in the lower elevations, the forest ecosystems that pine beetles inhabit are kept in a balance by factors such as tree defense mechanisms, beetle defense mechanisms, and freezing temperatures. It is a simple relationship between a host (the forest), an agent (the beetle) and the environment (the weather & temperature). However, as climate change causes mountain areas to become warmer and drier, pine beetles have more power to infest and destroy the forest ecosystems, such as the whitebark pine forests of the Rockies. This is a forest so important to forest ecosystems that it is called the "rooftop of the rockies". Climate change has led to a threatening pine beetle pandemic, causing them to spread far beyond their native habitat. This leads to ecosystem changes, forest fires, floods and hazards to human health.

The whitebark pine ecosystem in these high elevations plays many essential roles, providing support to plant and animal life.  They provide food for grizzly bears and squirrels, as well as shelter and breeding grounds for elk and deer; protects watersheds by sending water to parched foothills and plains; serves as a reservoir by dispensing supplies of water from melted snowpacks that are trapped beneath the shaded areas; and creates new soil which allows for growth of other trees and plant species. Without these pines, animals do not have adequate food, water, or shelter, and the reproductive life cycle, as well as quality of life, is affected as a consequence. Normally, the pine beetle cannot survive in these frigid temperatures and high elevation of the Rocky Mountains. However, warmer temperatures means that the pine beetle can now survive and attack these forests, as it no longer is cold enough to freeze and kill the beetle at such elevations. Increased temperatures also allow the pine beetle to increase their life cycle by 100%: it only takes a single year instead of two for the pine beetle to develop. As the Rockies have not adapted to deal with pine beetle infestations, they lack the defenses to fight the beetles. Warmer weather patterns, drought, and beetle defense mechanisms together dries out sap in pine trees, which is the main mechanism of defense that trees have against the beetle, as it drowns the beetles and their eggs. This makes it easier for the beetle to infest and release chemicals into the tree, luring other beetles in an attempt to overcome the weakened defense system of the pine tree. As a consequence, the host (forest) becomes more vulnerable to the disease-causing agent (the beetle).

The whitebark forests of the Rockies are not the only forests that have been affected by the mountain pine beetle. Due to temperature changes and wind patterns, the pine beetle has now spread through the Continental Divide of the Rockies and has invaded the fragile boreal forests of Alberta, known as the "lungs of the Earth". These forests are imperative for producing oxygen through photosynthesis and removing carbon in the atmosphere. But as the forests become infested and die, carbon dioxide is released into the environment, and contributes even more to a warming climate. Ecosystems and humans rely on the supply of oxygen in the environment, and threats to this boreal forest results in severe consequences to our planet and human health. In a forest ravaged by pine beetle, the dead logs and kindle which can easily be ignited by lightning. Forest fires present dangers to the environment, human health and the economy.  They are detrimental to air quality and vegetation, releasing toxic and carcinogenic compounds as they burn. Due to human induced deforestation and climate change, along with the pine beetle pandemic, the strength of forest ecosystems decrease. The infestations and resulting diseases can indirectly, but seriously, effect human health. As droughts and temperature increases continue, so does the frequency of devastating forest fires, insect infestations, forest diebacks, acid rain, habitat loss, animal endangerment and threats to safe drinking water.

Mountain habitats
Mountains cover approximately 25 percent of earth's surface and provide a home to more than one-tenth of global human population. Changes in global climate pose a number of potential risks to mountain habitats. Researchers expect that over time, climate change will affect mountain and lowland ecosystems, the frequency and intensity of forest fires, the diversity of wildlife, and the distribution of fresh water.

Studies suggest a warmer climate would cause lower-elevation habitats to expand into the higher alpine zone. Such a shift would encroach on rare alpine meadows and other high-altitude habitats. High-elevation plants and animals have limited space available for new habitat as they move higher on the mountains in order to adapt to long-term changes in regional climate. Such uphill shifts of both ranges and abundances have been recorded for various groups of species across the world.

Changes in climate are melting glaciers and reducing the depth of the mountain snowpacks. Any changes in their seasonal melting can have powerful impacts on areas that rely on freshwater runoff from mountains. Rising temperature may cause snow to melt earlier and faster in the spring and shift the timing and distribution of runoff. These changes could affect the availability of freshwater for natural systems and human uses.

Marine ecosystems

Monitoring studies on tropical coral reefs were made by Bak and Nieuwland (1995) in order to explore climate change on the sublittoral communities in the North Sea. "Bak and Nieuwland (1995) monitored permanent quadrates for over two decades and showed a significant decrease in coral colonies, particularly at disturbed shallower reefs. Whereas most of the degradation processes are directly related to human influence, a rise in the temperature of ocean waters will lead to drastic reef degradation in the long run." Rising temperatures increase the risk of irreversible loss of marine and coastal ecosystems

Freshwater ecosystems

Salt water contamination and cool water species

Species of fish living in cold or cool water can see a reduction in population of up to 50% in the majority of U.S. fresh water streams, according to most climate change models. The increase in metabolic demands due to higher water temperatures, in combination with decreasing amounts of food will be the main contributors to their decline. Additionally, many fish species (such as salmon) utilize seasonal water levels of streams as a means of reproducing, typically breeding when water flow is high and migrating to the ocean after spawning. Because snowfall is expected to be reduced due to climate change, water runoff is expected to decrease which leads to lower flowing streams, effecting the spawning of millions of salmon. To add to this, rising seas will begin to flood coastal river systems, converting them from fresh water habitats to saline environments where indigenous species will likely perish. In southeast Alaska, the sea rises by 3.96 cm/year, redepositing sediment in various river channels and bringing salt water inland. This rise in sea level not only contaminates streams and rivers with saline water, but also the reservoirs they are connected to, where species such as Sockeye Salmon live. Although this species of Salmon can survive in both salt and fresh water, the loss of a body of fresh water stops them from reproducing in the spring, as the spawning process requires fresh water. Undoubtedly, the loss of fresh water systems of lakes and rivers in Alaska will result in the imminent demise of the state's once-abundant population of salmon.

Species migration

For example, in the Siberian subarctic, species migration is contributing to another warming albedo-feedback, as needle-shedding larch trees are being replaced with dark-foliage evergreen conifers which can absorb some of the solar radiation that previously reflected off the snowpack beneath the forest canopy. It has been projected many fish species will migrate towards the North and South poles as a result of climate change, and that many species of fish near the Equator will go extinct as a result of global warming.

Migratory birds are especially at risk for endangerment due to the extreme dependability on temperature and air pressure for migration, foraging, growth, and reproduction. Much research has been done on the effects of climate change on birds, both for future predictions and for conservation. The species said to be most at risk for endangerment or extinction are populations that are not of conservation concern. It is predicted that a 3.5 degree increase in surface temperature will occur by year 2100, which could result in between 600 and 900 extinctions, which mainly will occur in the tropical environments.

Species adaptation 

Climate change has affected the gene pool of the red deer population on Rùm, one of the Inner Hebrides islands, Scotland. Warmer temperatures resulted in deer giving birth on average three days earlier for each decade of the study. The gene which selects for earlier birth has increased in the population because those with the gene have more calves over their lifetime.

A study in Chicago showed that the length of birds' lower leg bones (an indicator of body sizes) shortened by an average of 2.4% and their wings lengthened by 1.3%. A study from central Amazon showed that birds have decreased in mass (an indicator of size) by up to 2% per decade, and increased in wing length by up to 1% per decade, with links to temperature and precipitation shifts. The findings of these studies suggest the morphological changes are the result of climate change, and may demonstrate an example of evolutionary change following Bergmann's rule.

The Jutfelt Fish Ecophysiology lab at the Norwegian University of Science and Technology (NTNU), under their director professor Fredrik Jutfelt, investigates how evolution can lead to physiological adaptation to the temperature environment where the fish live. They recently performed a large artificial selection experiment, published in Proceedings of the National Academy of Sciences of the United States of America (PNAS), showing that evolution of tolerance to warming can occur in fish. The rate of evolution, however, was suggested to be too slow for evolutionary rescue to protect fish from the impacts of climate change.

Impacts of species degradation due to climate change on livelihoods 
The livelihoods of nature dependent communities depend on abundance and availability of certain species. Climate change conditions such as increase in atmospheric temperature and carbon dioxide concentration directly affect availability of biomass energy, food, fiber and other ecosystem services. Degradation of species supplying such products directly affect the livelihoods of people relying on them more so in Africa. The situation is likely to be exacerbated by changes in rainfall variability which is likely to give dominance to invasive species especially those that are spread across large latitudinal gradients. The effects that climate change has on both plant and animal species within certain ecosystems has the ability to directly affect the human inhabitants who rely on natural resources. Frequently, the extinction of plant and animal species create a cyclic relationship of species endangerment in ecosystems which are directly affected by climate change.

See also

 Effects of climate change on the water cycle
Mycorrhizae and climate change

References

Climate change and the environment
Ecosystems
Ecosystems
Articles containing video clips